Lieutenant General Khem Karan Singh MVC (March 5, 1921 – July 26, 2016) was a General Officer in the Indian Army. He was awarded Padma Bhushan for his services to the nation during the 1971 war.
He also received Maha Vir Chakra for his services during 1965 Indo-Pakistan war.

Early life and education
He was born in 1919 in Rohtak district in Haryana. A third generation Cavalry Officer, his grandfather Risaldar Major Ram Singh and father Honorary Major Bharat Singh has served in the 14th Murray's Jat Lancers (which later became 20th Lancers). Singh attended the St. Stephen's College, Delhi.

Military career
Singh was commissioned into the 16th Light Cavalry in 1941, which he later commanded. In the Indo-Pakistani War of 1965, Singh commanded the 1 Armoured Brigade and was awarded the Maha Vir Chakra.

Maha Vir Chakra
The citation for the Maha Vir Chakra reads as follows:

After the war, Singh was promoted to the rank of Major General and commanded a division and served as the Chief of Staff of the Western Command. He then took over the important appointment of Director of Military Operations (DMO) at Army HQ under the Chief of the Army Staff General Sam Manekshaw.  In October 1971, just before the outbreak of the war, Singh was sent to command I Corps, then the only Strike Corps of the Indian Army. For his meritorious service, Singh was awarded the third highest civilian award - the Padma Bhushan.

In November 1973, Singh was promoted to Army Commander grade and took over as the 5th General Officer Commanding-in-Chief (GOC-in-C) Central Command.

After a two-year stint as GOC-in-C Central Command, Singh retired in 1975.

References

Indian generals
Recipients of the Padma Bhushan in civil service
Generals of the Indo-Pakistani War of 1971
Recipients of the Maha Vir Chakra
People from Rohtak district
1921 births
2016 deaths